Brandon Burlon (born March 5, 1990) is a Canadian ice hockey defenceman who is currently a free agent. He most recently played for Orli Znojmo of what is now the ICE Hockey League (ICEHL). He was drafted by the New Jersey Devils of the National Hockey League (NHL) in the 2nd round (56th overall) of the 2008 NHL Entry Draft.

Playing career
Burlon played junior hockey with St. Michael's Buzzers in the Ontario Junior Hockey League. In 2008, he moved to the United States to play college hockey with the University of Michigan Wolverines of the Central Collegiate Hockey Association (CCHA). In his first season with the Wolverines, he was honored by being selected to the 2008–09 CCHA All-Rookie Team. On June 2, 2011, Burlon signed an entry-level contract with the New Jersey Devils.

After five seasons with the Albany Devils of the AHL while within the Devils organization, Burlon left as a free agent following the 2015–16 season. On August 3, 2016, Burlon opted to continue his AHL career, signing a one-year deal with new AHL affiliate of the Arizona Coyotes, the Tucson Roadrunners. In signing, Burlon became the club's first addition to their inaugural season in 2016–17. In his season with the Roadrunners, Burlon was limited to just 33 games due to injury, recording 3 goals and 11 points.

As a free agent, Burlon embarked on a European career, agreeing to a one-year deal with German club, Düsseldorfer EG of the DEL on May 2, 2017. At the conclusion of his contract with DEG, Burlon continued his European career agreeing to a one-year deal with Norwegian club, Stavanger Oilers of the GET on July 26, 2018.

Career statistics

Awards and honours

References

External links

1990 births
Albany Devils players
Düsseldorfer EG players
Living people
Michigan Wolverines men's ice hockey players
New Jersey Devils draft picks
Stavanger Oilers players
Tucson Roadrunners players
Canadian ice hockey defencemen